Laik-Gi was governor of Pegu in the late 13th and early 14th centuries. He became governor of the province  1296 after his overlord King Wareru of Martaban had defeated the self-proclaimed king of Pegu Tarabya. Prior to the appointment, Laik-Gi had served as the chief minister of Wareru's upstart Mon-speaking kingdom since its founding in 1287. He also led the diplomatic mission to the court of King Ram Khamhaeng of Sukhothai in 1286–1287 that secured Sukhothai's backing of Wareru's plan to declare independence from the Pagan Empire.

Chronicles do not state when Laik-Gi's term at Pegu ended.

References

Bibliography
 

Hanthawaddy dynasty